Sainte-Colombe station is a railway station in the commune of Sainte-Colombe, in the French department of Doubs, in the Bourgogne-Franche-Comté region. It is an intermediate stop on the Frasne–Les Verrières line of SNCF.

Services
The following services stop at Sainte-Colombe:

References

External links 
 
 

Railway stations in Doubs